Jordan Coelho (born 2 April 1992) is a French swimmer. He competed in the men's 200 metre butterfly event at the 2016 Summer Olympics.

References

External links
 

1992 births
Living people
People from Étampes
Olympic swimmers of France
Swimmers at the 2016 Summer Olympics
Place of birth missing (living people)
Swimmers at the 2010 Summer Youth Olympics
Sportspeople from Essonne
Swimmers at the 2018 Mediterranean Games
French male butterfly swimmers
Mediterranean Games competitors for France
20th-century French people
21st-century French people